= What A Place! =

Book by Lana Sultan

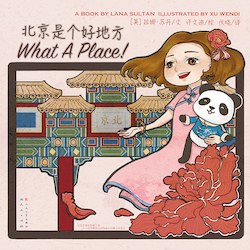
- Book Cover
- Author: Lana Sultan
- Illustrator: Xu Wendi
- Language: English & Mandarin
- Genre: Children's literature
- Publisher: Daylight Publishing House (天天出版社)
- Publication date: April 1, 2016
- Publication place: China
- Pages: 24pp
- ISBN: 978-7-5016-1104-1

What A Place! is a bilingual children's picture book written by Lana Sultan and illustrated by Xu Wendi written in both English and Mandarin. It was published on April 1, 2016, in Beijing, China by Daylight Publishing House (天天出版社). What A Place! is Lana's fifth book.

== Synopsis ==
What A Place! is about a little girl's yearlong journey throughout the city of Beijing, as she enjoys the city's sights, sounds, and festivities.

== Reception ==
The book was featured as a full-page spread in the June 10, 2016 Holiday Edition issue of China Daily; which has the widest print circulation of any English-language newspaper in China.
